Communauté d'agglomération Bassin d'Arcachon Sud is the communauté d'agglomération, an intercommunal structure, covering the area south of the Arcachon Bay. It is located in the Gironde department, in the Nouvelle-Aquitaine region, southwestern France. Created in 2001, its seat is in Arcachon. Its area is 328.8 km2. Its population was 68,185 in 2019.

Composition
The communauté d'agglomération consists of the following 4 communes:

References

Bassin d'Arcachon Sud
Bassin d'Arcachon Sud